Wasahaban is a 1978 painted aluminum sculpture by Robert Murray, installed outside the Columbus Museum of Art in Columbus, Ohio, United States. The abstract artwork, painted blue-green, is 7 ft., 6 in. tall and 6 ft. wide. It was fabricated by Lippincott, Inc., and acquired by the museum in 1979 with funds provided by the Hattie W. and Robert Lazarus Fund of The Columbus Foundation, as well as the National Endowment for the Arts.

See also

 1978 in art

References

1978 sculptures
Abstract sculptures in the United States
Aluminum sculptures in Ohio
Columbus Museum of Art
Downtown Columbus, Ohio
Outdoor sculptures in Columbus, Ohio